Genius is the second album from Krizz Kaliko, an American rapper from Kansas City, Missouri, which was released on July 14, 2009. It features guest appearances from Tech N9ne, E-40, Kutt Calhoun and Big Scoob.

On July 7, 2009, a music video for the single "Misunderstood" was released on the Strange Music YouTube Account.

When discussing the song "Misunderstood" in an interview, Krizz revealed the inspiration behind the production of the song. The idea struck him while watching an infomercial for the 1960s show, The Munsters. He called up the producer, Michael Summers, and told him to "youtube the Munsters theme song, then call me back and I'll tell you how to do this beat." He notes that several of the instruments used to construct the beat are the same used to compose the Munsters theme.

Track listing

References

2009 albums
Krizz Kaliko albums
Albums produced by Seven (record producer)
Strange Music albums